Jericho is an unincorporated community in Cameron County, in the U.S. state of Pennsylvania.

History
The community was named after the ancient city of Jericho.

References

Unincorporated communities in Cameron County, Pennsylvania
Unincorporated communities in Pennsylvania